Eduard Gottlieb Profittlich, SJ (11 September 1890, in Birresdorf, village near Koblenz, German Empire – 22 February 1942, in Kirov, Soviet Union) was a Jesuit German Catholic archbishop, apostolic administrator of Estonia, victim of Soviet persecution, martyr and servant of God.

Biography

Early years
Profittlich was born on 11 September 1890 in Birresdorf, German Empire. He was the eighth of ten children born to peasant farmers, Markus Profittlich (1846-1920) and Dorothea Seiwert (1850-1913).
After finishing elementary school in Leimersdorf, in 1904 he was prepared by a local parish priest to take up further education in Ahrweiler. In 1909, he moved to the school in Linz am Rhein, graduating from high school in 1912 and receiving a secondary school certificate and entered the seminary of Trier, but did not graduate. His parents wanted him to become a diocesan priest to help them in emergency situations, but on 11 April 1913 he entered the Society of Jesus in 's-Heerenberg, Netherlands, where the German Jesuits had settled as a result of their expulsion caused by the Kulturkampf of Bismarck. His older brother Peter (1878-1915) died as a missionary in Brazil. Profittlich also wanted to become a Catholic priest and in September 1914 continued his studies at the scholasticate of Valkenburg aan de Geul, Netherlands.

During the First World War he served as an Army nurse and surgical assistant in a hospital in Vuizven, France from 1915 to 1918. On 4 January 1916, Profittlich received the tonsure and consecration to subdeacon, in the Cathedral of Trier by Heinrich Döring, SJ, (1859-1951), bishop of Poona.

Priest
Eduard Profittlich resumed his philosophical and theological studies at Maastricht after the war and was there ordained deacon at Valkenburg on 26 March 1922 by the Archbishop of Cologne Cardinal Karl Joseph Schulte (1871-1941). On 27 August 1922 Profittlich was ordained priest by Lorenz Schrijnen, bishop of Roermond, and on 30 August 1922 celebrated in his home parish church of St. Stephen in Leimersdorf his first Mass.

Profittlich entered the new Pontifical Oriental Institute in Rome, founded in 1917 by Pope Benedict XV, with the intention of preparing for clandestine missionary work in Russia. In 1923 he became a doctor in philosophy and in 1924 doctor in theology at the Jagiellonian University of Kraków. From September 1924 to June 1925 he was a missionary in Czechowice-Dziedzice, Poland, and from August 1925 to Match 1928 in Opole, a German city with many Poles; from 9 March 1928 to 1930 he was parish priest in the Polish parish of Saint Ansgar in Hamburg, and after 11 December 1930 parish priest at St Peter and St Paul in Tallinn, appointed by the apostolic administrator of Estonia, Archbishop Antonio Zecchini, SJ, after his profession of perpetual vows on 2 February 1930.

Apostolic Administrator and bishop
On 11 May 1931 Profittlich was appointed Apostolic Administrator of largely Polish Estonia, due to his good knowledge of Polish and Polish affairs. Catholicism had been banned from 1561 until 1719. The Catholic Church in Estonia at that time was relatively small, poor, and dispersed. As new administrator he quickly developed a pastoral plan. His sermons were particularly popular, attracting also those of other faiths. For the next ten years, he played a leading role in building the Catholic Church in Estonia. "Without the contribution of the bishop, the Catholic Church would not have withstood the years of occupation."

He began publishing the country's first church weekly magazine Kiriku Elu (The Life of the Church), which was read especially by the Estonian intelligentsia. "He was well-known among Estonian intellectuals, worked on publishing, interacted with the political elite, and was one of the authorities in independent Estonian society." The number of the faithful grew steadily and new parishes were established in: Narva, Pärnu, Rakvere, Petseri, Valga and Kiviõli. On 28 September 1933, in a private audience at the Vatican, Pope Pius XI named him a protonotary apostolic in recognition of his services.

Profittlich was a recognized preacher and a bishop. He began to address the issue of Estonian-language literature on the subject of religion. He tried to change the image of the Catholic Church as a "Polish church", and be more open and closer to Estonians. In 1935, he requested and received Estonian citizenship.

Archbishop
After the signing of the treaty between the Vatican and Estonia in 1935, under which the legal status of the apostolic administration in Estonia was confirmed, on 27 November 1936 he was named titular archbishop of Adrianople and on 27 December 1936 consecrated archbishop at the parish church of St Peter and St Paul in Tallinn, while remaining an apostolic administrator. Profittlich was the first Catholic bishop in Estonia since the passage of Estonian territories to Sweden in the 17th century.

After the Soviet occupation of Estonia in June 1940, Profittlich had to decide whether to leave or stay. He wrote Pope Pius XII for guidance. The Pope advised him to do whichever he felt in nomine Domini. He decided to stay. He went to the German embassy in Tallinn three times to obtain exit visas for certain Catholic priests, fifteen sisters and Baltic Germans to leave for Germany. However, the church's situation had deteriorated, with priest and faithful persecuted by the communists. He described the whole situation in a letter to the Pope. At that time, the German embassy in Tallinn insisted that he take German citizenship again and renounce his Estonian citizenship, but he refused.

In a letter to relatives and acquaintances on 8 February 1941, he wrote that the shepherd's place is with the flock where he shares the joy and suffering. He wrote that it is a great pleasure to experience the presence of God to whom we have given everything and that he is ready to give God his life for all: "My life – and, if necessary, my death – is life and death for Christ."

Arrest and death
On 27 June 1941, a few days after the Third Reich attack on the USSR, Profittlich was arrested by eight NKVD agents and transferred to prison in Kirov, Russia, for anti-Soviet agitation and assistance to Catholic ecclesiastics abroad. He was repeatedly interrogated and on 14 October 1941 a bill of indictment was prepared in Kirov, in which he was accused of carrying out anti-Soviet agitation by using the religious feelings of the masses to incite hatred for the USSR and the Communist Party. In addition, he was accused of espionage in favor of the Third Reich, proven by his visit to the embassy in Tallinn. After the next interrogations, on 17 October 17, he was confronted with further evidence of anti-Soviet talks with his fellow prisoner. He always maintained his innocence.

The trial began on 25 October 1941, and he was found guilty. His appeal to the Supreme Court of the USSR was rejected. He was sentenced to 5 years imprisonment and work in the labor camp in Kirov, but on 21 November of the same year he was sentenced to death by shooting, for anti-Soviet activities and espionage for Germany. On 22 February 1942 he died from exposure at Kirov before the sentence was carried out.

For 50 years after his arrest the future of the Archbishop was unknown. It was suspected that he was imprisoned in Ufa and later in Kazan. Even searching for members of his family did not bring anything new to the matter. A breakthrough came on 30 March 1990, when Estonia regained its independence. On 12 June 1990 the Supreme Court informed the Catholic Church about the fate of the Archbishop and the court has completely rehabilitated the clergy post mortem, and declared him innocent of the alleged crimes. Archives were also opened, in which documents of the Archbishop's case were kept.

Process of holiness

His honor is named on the premises of the Tartu Catholic Education Center, and a memorial plaque (open on 11 September 1990) has been placed in the St Peter and St Paul Roman Catholic Church in Tallinn. The cathedral has a museum displaying some of the Archbishop's effects.

The Bishops' Conference of the Russian Federation initiated on 30 January 2002 the beatification process of Archbishop Eduard Profittlich (along with 15 lay people, priests and bishops). After the Congregation for the Causes of Saints granted the "nihil obstat" under the title "Causa Beatificationis seu Declarationis Martyrii Servorum Dei Eduardi Profittlich Archiepiscopi titularis Hadrianopolitani in Haemimonto Administratoris Apostolici Estoniensis, ex Societate Iesu et XV Sociorum", on 30 May 2003 an ecclesiastical procedure was opened in Saint Petersburg for Eduard Profittlich's beatification. In March 2019, the beatification documents of Archbishop Eduard Profittlich reached the Congregation in Rome and were validated on 12 June 2020.

References

Sources
 Vello Salo. "EPISCOPUS ET MARTYR Eduard Profittlich in Estonia 1930-1941". - Maarjamaa, No 2 (133), 2011.
 Lambert Klinke. "Erzbischof Eduard Profittlich und die Katolische Kirche in Estland 1930-1942". Ulm, Hess, 2000.
 "Der Fels", "Erzbischof Dr. Eduard Profittlich - ein Opfer des Kommunismus" (German), No. 7, R. 34, June 2003.

Further reading
 Alena Kharko: Eduard Profittlich. In: Thomas Bremer, Burkhard Haneke (Hrsg.): Witnesses for God: Faith in communist time, Bd. 1. Aschendorff publishing house, Muenster 2014, S. 47–64.
 Lambert Klinke: Art. Archbishop Eduard Profittlich. In: Helmut Moll (ed.): Witnesses to Christ. The German martyrology of the 20th century, 6th, extended and restructured edition, Schöningh, Paderborn 2015, Vol. 2, pp. 1096–1100.
 Lambert Klinke: Archbishop Eduard Profittlich and the Catholic Church in Estonia 1930–1942. Hess, Bad Schussenried 2000, .
 Lambert Klinke: Profittlich, Eduard. In: Biographical Bibliographic Church Lexicon (BBKL). Volume 19, Bautz, Nordhausen 2001, Sp. 1104–1114.
 Lambert Klinke: Peapiiskop Eduard Profittlich: Elu ja saatus. In: Akadeemia. Eesti kirjanike liidu kuukiri Tartus, ISSN 0235-7771, vol. 12 (2000), No. 2, 288-297 (Estonian).

External links
 http://www.catholic-hierarchy.org/bishop/bprof.html
 santiebeati
 it.catholicmartyrs.org
 russiacristiana.org
 http://www.eha.ee/fa/public//index.php?act=search_detail&a_id=2553&isik=&autor=&esitaja=&string=&pealk=&mark=&mod=3&lang=et&nocache=1368796576
 http://viaf.org/viaf/72300388/
 https://portal.dnb.de/opac.htm?method=simpleSearch&cqlMode=true&query=nid%3D123410940

1890 births
1942 deaths
20th-century Roman Catholic titular archbishops
Apostolic pronotaries
Estonian people of German descent
Estonian Roman Catholic archbishops
Estonian Jesuits
Jesuit bishops
German Servants of God
Catholic martyrs
Catholic Church in Russia
Estonian people who died in Soviet detention
German expatriates in the Netherlands
People from Ahrweiler (district)
People from the Rhine Province